The 1923 World Allround Speed Skating Championships took place at 10 and 11 February 1923 at the ice rink Östermalms Idrottsplats in Stockholm, Sweden.

Harald Strøm was defending champion but did not succeed in prolonging his title.
Clas Thunberg became World champion for the first time.

Allround results 

  * = Fell
 NC = Not classified
 NF = Not finished
 NS = Not started
 DQ = Disqualified
Source: SpeedSkatingStats.com

Rules 
Four distances have to be skated:
 500m
 1500m
 5000m
 10000m

The ranking was made by award ranking points. The points were awarded to the skaters who had skated all the distances. The final ranking was then decided by ordering the skaters by lowest point totals.
 1 point for 1st place
 2 point for 2nd place
 3 point for 3rd place
 and so on

One could win the World Championships also by winning at least three of the four distances, so the ranking could be affected by this.

Silver and bronze medals were awarded.

References 

World Allround Speed Skating Championships, 1923
1923 World Allround
World Allround, 1923
International sports competitions in Stockholm
World Allround Speed Skating Championships
World Allround Speed Skating Championships
1920s in Stockholm